Rieku ja Raiku is a Finnish comic strip.

The strip originally started as a parody of an earlier comic called Kieku ja Kaiku, and takes obvious inspiration from it. Kieku ja Kaiku was an educational children's comic strip about two anthropomorphic young roosters. One of them, called Kaiku, would usually do something foolish, and the other, called Kieku, would then look after him, giving an educational message to the young readers. The comic's dialogue was all in poetic verse.

Rieku ja Raiku is aimed at a more mature audience. It is drawn in a more cartoony and less realistic style. The characters, Rieku and Raiku, are nondescript adult male birds, whose adventures mainly concern going out to bars to drink booze and try to pick up female birds. The poetic verse of the dialogue has been faithfully preserved, but it doesn't have educational messages any more.
The strip is published in a couple of magazines aimed at young adults and middle-agers.

Comic strips missing date information
Finnish comic strips